Kirk Alan Ludwig (born May 11, 1959) is an American philosopher who is Professor of Philosophy and Cognitive Science at Indiana University.

Education and career 

Ludwig graduated summa cum laude with a B.S. in physics from the University of California, Santa Barbara in 1981 and earned his Ph.D. in philosophy at the University of California, Berkeley in 1990, where he worked with Donald Davidson.  He joined the faculty at the University of Florida in 1990, where he taught until 2010 when he joined Indiana University Bloomington.

Philosophical work 

Ludwig works in Philosophy of Language, Philosophy of Mind, Epistemology, Metaphysics, and Philosophy of Action.  He is best known for his work on natural language semantics in the tradition of Donald Davidson, his interpretation of the work of Donald Davidson with Ernest Lepore, his work on collective action, shared intention, and institutional agency, and his work on the epistemology of thought experiments and philosophical intuition.  He has collaborated extensively with Marija Jankovic, Ernest Lepore, and Greg Ray, as well as with Emil Badici, John Biro, Daniel Boisvert, Wade Munroe, and Susan Schneider.

Selected bibliography

See also
 Donald Davidson
 Radical interpretation
 Logical Form
 Ernest Lepore

External links 
Kirk Ludwig Indiana University Faculty Page
Kirk Ludwig Personal Webpage
Keynote Address on The Social Construction of Legal Norms, ENSO VI, September 2019

References 

21st-century American philosophers
Philosophers of mind
Epistemologists
Metaphysicians
1959 births
Living people
20th-century American philosophers
Action theorists
Philosophers of language
Analytic philosophers
Indiana University faculty